The Crazy World of Julius Vrooder is a 1974 film from Playboy Enterprises directed by Arthur Hiller and produced by Hugh Hefner.  This was the final film for actor George Marshall.

Plot

A Vietnam veteran who pretends to be insane ends up being admitted to the V.A. Hospital. He escapes and builds an underground bunker, which he equips with utilities such as electricity, and also falls in love with his nurse, Zanni.

Main cast

See also
 List of American films of 1974

References

External links 
 
 

1970 films
1970 drama films
Films about psychiatry
Vietnam War films
Films directed by Arthur Hiller
American drama films
Playboy Productions films
1974 drama films
1974 films
1970s English-language films
1970s American films